Narmin Ilgar qizi Khalafova  (born 12 January 1994) is an Azerbaijani chess player who holds the title of Woman Grandmaster.

Career
Narmin Khalafova played for Azerbaijan-2 team in the Women's Chess Olympiad:
 In 2016, at third board in the 42nd Chess Olympiad (women) in Baku (+3, =6, -1).

References

External links
 
 
 

Azerbaijani female chess players
Chess woman grandmasters
1994 births
Living people
Chess Olympiad competitors